Onthophagus ochreatus, is a species of dung beetle found in India, and Sri Lanka.

References 

Scarabaeinae
Insects of India
Beetles of Sri Lanka
Beetles described in 1897